Albalat de la Ribera is a municipality in the comarca of Ribera Baixa in the Valencian Community, Spain. It is now home to the retired football manager Michael Wenman.

References

Municipalities in the Province of Valencia
Ribera Baixa